Renmin Street Subdistrict  is a subdistrict situated in Chengzhong District, Xining, Qinghai, China. , it administers the following two residential neighborhoods:
Nanguan Street Community
Shuijingxiang Community

See also
List of township-level divisions of Qinghai

References

Township-level divisions of Qinghai
Xining
Subdistricts of the People's Republic of China